The Battle of Sarikamish was an engagement between the Russian and the Ottoman Empires during World War I that took place from December 22, 1914 to January 17, 1915 as part of the Caucasus campaign.

The battle resulted in a Russian victory. The Ottomans employed a strategy that demanded highly-mobile troops who could arrive at specified objectives at precise times. The approach was based on both German and Napoleonic tactics. The Ottoman troops, ill-prepared for winter conditions, suffered major casualties in the Allahuekber Mountains. Around 25,000 Ottoman soldiers had frozen to death before the start of the battle.

After the battle, Ottoman War Minister Enver Pasha, who had planned the Ottoman strategy in Sarikamish, publicly blamed his defeat on the Armenians, and the battle served as a prelude to the Armenian genocide.

Background
Russia viewed the Caucasus Front as secondary to the Eastern Front, which enjoyed the major share of Russian resources. Russia had taken the fortress of Kars from the Turks during the Russo-Turkish War in 1877, when it was incorporated into the militarily administered Kars Oblast. After the Ottoman Empire entered the war in October 1914 on the side of the Central Powers, Russia now feared a Caucasus Campaign aimed at retaking Kars and the port of Batum.

From the point of view of the Central Powers, a campaign in the Caucasus would have a distracting effect on Russian forces. The immediate strategic goal of the Caucasus Campaign was to retake Artvin, Ardahan, Kars, and the port of Batum. As a longer-term goal, head of the Ottoman war ministry İsmail Enver hoped a success would facilitate opening the route to Tbilisi and beyond, which in turn would trigger a revolt of Caucasian Muslims. Another Turkish strategic goal was to cut Russian access to its hydrocarbon resources around the Caspian Sea.

Prelude

The headquarters of the Ottoman 3rd Army was in Erzurum, under the command of Hasan Izzet. On 30 October 1914, the 3rd Army headquarters was informed by High Command in Constantinople about the Ottoman navy's bombardment of the Russian ports of Novorossiysk, Odessa and Sevastopol in the Black Sea. High Command expected the Russian Army to cross the Ottoman border at any time. The Bergmann Offensive (November 2, 1914 – November 16, 1914) ended with the defeat of Russian troops under Bergmann.

Turks’ IX (28,000 soldiers) and X Corps (40,000 soldiers) were well-trained soldiers but the Ottoman Army was poorly equipped with winter clothes. Rear services, logistic and sanitary measures were inadequate as well.

The war minister, Ismail Enver, devised an operation plan while he was at the Department of War in Istanbul. His strategy was based on German principles copied from Napoleon. Enver's plan involved a single envelopment using three Corps. On the right flank, XI Corps would fix the Russians in place and conduct feint attacks. In the left flank, X (40,000 soldiers) under Colonel Hafız Hakkı and IX Corps (28,000 soldiers) under brigadier Ali İhsan Paşa would reach Kötek (30 kilometers southwest of Sarikamish) and 10-15 kilometers northeast of main Russian Army (2nd Turkistan Corps: 21 Battalions, 22 Battalions of 1st Caucasus Corps, 11 Battalions of 1st and 2nd Plastun Brigade (6 battalions), 1st Caucasus Cossack Division (30 sotni (Squadron: 100-150 cavalry), and drive the Russians to the Aras Valley, where the Russian forces would be destroyed by all three Corps attacking in concert.

Hasan İzzet was firstly in favor of outflanking maneuver and offensive due to high trust to Enver Paşa and Hasan İzzet Paşa gave the final shape of the outflanking plan. In 17 December, Enver Pasha returned Erzurum after inspecting the army and seeing Hasan İzzet Paşa accepted his plan. In the presence of other officers, Enver Paşa said to Hasan İzzet Paşa “I am going to Erzurum. Either I will go back to Istanbul from there, or I will look at your actions as a spectator”. However, in 18 November, Hasan İzzet Paşa telegraphed Enver Pasha:

IX Corps, X Corps’ pioneers would arrive on the Kötek-Kars road in eight to nine days, meanwhile it is doubtful that the XI Corps, left alone, would not be crushed. When the pioneers come out of the great mountains, they will be in a difficult position against the enemy, who are not less than themselves. I see the outcome of this offensive field battle as doubtful according to our preparation. In case of failure, the long expedition will turn against us. Let's not give a pitched battle and be content with expelling the enemy in Id (Narman). For the future, hope is left for attack and invasion…  

In sources, Enver Pasha's answer isn't recorded. Then, Hasan İzzet Pasha telegraphed Enver Pasha again on the evening of 18 December.

I ask for forgiveness from my duty as I do not see the strength and confidence in myself to carry out these movements, and I am actually disturbed by an extraordinary nervousness”. 

Enver Pasha returned Köprüköy in order to persuade Hasan İzzet Pasha. He temporarily took command of 3rd army as he couldn't persuade Hasan İzzet Pasha. 
Enver Pasha's chief of staff Bronsart von Schellendorf and operation department manager (in Turkish: Harekat Şubesi Müdürü) Major Feldmann continued their service in the 3rd army under Enver Pasha.

Battle

Battlefield

The main difficulty with the region was the roads, with the transportation infrastructure on the Ottoman side far from adequate. Russia's main advantage was the Kars Gyumri Akhalkalaki railway line and a terminal at Sarikamish. The only way for an army to get through the Caucasian heights was the high mountain passes in which lay the cities Kars and Sarikamish. Beyond, the upper valleys of the Aras River and Euphrates extended westward. Everywhere else the roads were mere tracks which were impenetrable to artillery.
The 3rd Army, under the command of Enver, was composed of the IX, X and XI Corps. A detachment unit (1 regiment and the Special Organization (Teşkilat-I Mahsusa) volunteers) known as Ştanke Bey Müfrezesi under the command of the German Lieutenant Colonel Stange embarked Artvin to reinforce the offense and pin down the Russians. The fighting power of 90,000 regular troops (Russian Sarikamish detachment consisted of 60,000 infantry, 4,000 Cavalry (Cossacks), 14,000 Reserves totaled 78,000 soldiers), reserves, and personnel from the Erzurum Fortress totalled 118,000.[4] The total manpower including transportation units, deport regiments, and military police was 200,000. There were 73 machine guns (Russian had extreme advantage) and 218 (it is equal to Russians) artillery pieces. Ottoman forces were inadequately prepared for the campaign. IX and X Corps began a long trek with no winter clothing and only dry bread and olives for rations. XI Corps left at the front, also was in same situation.

The Russians sent the 2nd and 3rd Caucasian and 1st Turkestan Corps to the Western front to reinforce this front. Therefore, the Russian Caucasian Army consisted of the 1st Caucasian Corps (32 battalions), 2nd Turkestan Corps (21 battalions), 3 Plastun brigades (18 battalions), the 66th Division (16 battalions) and some independent detachments. The Russian force at the beginning of the war consisted of 100 infantry battalions (100 thousand infantry), 117 cavalry companies (15 thousand cavalry) and 256 cannons:

(a) Erzurum-Kars: 39th Infantry Division (16 battalions, 48 guns) and one brigade of 20th Infantry Division (24 battalions, each battalion has 1250-1300 soldiers), 1 Caucasian Cossack Division, 6 of 5 battalions 1rd Plastun Brigade (each battalion has 600-800 soldiers), total: 29 battalions, 30 sotni and 96 guns,  2nd Turkestan Corps (21 battalions, 42 guns, each battalion has 600–800 soldiers like Plaston Brigades, it reached Battlefield in 16 November). 
    
(b) Erzurum-Oltu: one brigade of 20th Infantry Division, one Cossack (cavalry) regiment (6 sotni), total: 8 battalions, 6 sotni, 24 guns (Erzurum-Kars aka Sarikamish detachment  borrowed 6 guns from Oltu detachment considering each Russian battalions 3 guns, Cossack divisions had 12 horsed guns, Plastuns (infantry Cossacks) had no guns. Both group under General Bergman in command of I Caucasian Army Corps.).   
 
(c) Erevan-Bayazit: one brigade of 66th Division (8 battalions), 2nd Kuban Plastun Brigade (6 battalions), 2nd Caucasian Cossack Division, Transcaspian Cossack Brigade, total: 14 battalions, 36 sotni, 52 guns. 
   
(d)  Batum region: 264th Infantry Regiment (of 66th Division), 1 of 6 1st Kuban Plastun Brigade (6 battalions), total: 5 battalions with 8 guns-to which were added one and a half battalions of Frontier Guards. The six battalions of the 3rd Kuban Plastun Brigade were echeloned along the coast of the Black Sea.   
   
(e) Detachment in Persian Azerbaijan:  2nd Caucasian Rifle Brigade, 4th Caucasian Cossack Division, total: 8 battalions, 24 sotni, 24 guns under General Chernozubov.

The garrison of Kars composed of the 263rd Infantry Regiment (of 66th Division): 4 battalions.  
 
Russian Caucasian Army in Battle of Sarikamish, which was reinforced by Armenian and Georgian volunteers and newly formed 3rd Caucasian Rifle Brigade (8 battalions), was around 130 thousand soldiers. In the Bergmann Offensive, the Russian army suffered 7,000 casualties.  Russian Army against Turk 3rd Army was 30 battalions of the 1st Caucasus Corps, 2nd Turkestan Corps (21 battalions) and 11 Plaston battalions totaled 58,000 infantry, 4,000 cavalry. In addition, there were 4 battalions of 66th Division in Kars and the newly formed 3rd Caucasian Rifle Brigade (8 battalions) and the Siberian Cossack Brigade (12 sotni) in Tbilisi, total 14,000 soldiers came for help in Battle of Sarikamish. Apart from these forces, 12 battalions of Russian troops were in Batumi and its surroundings, 8 battalions and 30 cavalry companies were in Iğdır, 8 battalions and 24 cavalry companies were in Iranian Azerbaijan and did not participate in the battles of Sarikamish. The Turks, on the other hand, had put forward all their troops (90,000 soldiers, 218 guns) in order to get a decided result in this battle. Another advantage of the Russians is that all of the Russian soldiers are equipped with winter clothes, the medical organization is much better than the Turks (from the beginning of the war, 500 soldiers died in hospitals on the Turkish side every day. The number of soldiers who died in the hospital was more than 10 thousand, more soldiers died from frostbite and Typhus epidemic outside hospitals as well. Turk soldiers used to not go hospitals because they knew they have a greater chance of survival outside the hospitals).

Initial manoeuvres, December 22–25
In farthest left flank, Hafız Hakkı with X Corps numbered 40.000 fresh troops attacked General Istomin's Brigade (8.000 infantry, 1.000 cavalry) in 22 December. 30th and 32rd Divisions attacked Kaleboğazı, west of Oltu and 31st Division attacked İd (now, Narman). In both sides, Russian retreated cautiously after rearguard battle. Istomin's Brigade retreated around Oltu Town.  31st Division spent the night in Narman (Now, Rus Narmanı in Turkish), 15 kilometers South of Oltu. In 23 December, 31st Division captured 750 soldiers and Colonel Kutatedza with 2 guns. 31st Division attacked Oltu from south and 30th and 32rd Division from west. 32rd Division opened dense artillery and rifle fire to 31st Division thinking 32rd Division is Russian troops. Battle continued 2 hours, thus General Istomin withdrew his army without heavy losses from Oltu. İlden, based on his friend battled in this battle, claimed that Turks suffered 2.000 casualties in this accidental battle. However, Fahri Belen asked casualties to various officers being on duty in this battle, he received different answers from each officer and the maximum amount of loss was said to be 250. >   In next days, 250 Russian soldiers 4 guns and 4 machine guns got captured by X Corps. In midday, Istomin evacuated Oltu. Hafız Hakkı allowed soldiers to pillage the town in order to raise their morale. Turks lost provisions that can feed Turks army for days due to this pillage.
After this, Hafız turned X Corps’ direction to Sarikamish-Kars line opposite of initially planned Kars-Kötek line. This change of path caused 40 kilometers lengthening to 30th and 31st Division.

On 23 December, 39th Division attacked Turkish XI Corps and captured large number of prisoners.

In 22–24 December, IX Corps reached Bardız village from Toygarlı village. IX Corps didn't engage in combat like X Corps, except to disperse the patrolling front guards. 29th Division captured Bardız from front guards on night of December 24. As the Russians did not have time to destroy the supplies, there were supplies in the Bardız that could feed the corps for days. Enver Pasha set up guards in the supply depots for preventing looting of the village, thus the mistake in Oltu didn't happen. However, in the same day, 40% of 17th Division's troops became stragglers due to heavy snowstorm.

On 24 December, General Vorontsov sent his deputy General Myshlayevsky and chief of staff General Yudenich with officers to meet with General Bergmann in Micingirt (now İnkaya). Bergmann said that offensive to Istomin's detachment had only local significance, Istomin will repel and retake Oltu from Turks after his troops are reinforced by 3rd Caucasus Rifle Brigade. On the main front, 39th Division should continue to successful offensive. General Yudenich opposed Bergmann's idea. He said that attack on Istomin detachment is signal of Turks’ outflanking maneuver.  Turks are encircling our right flank, we must occupy Bardız Village in order to cover road to Sarikamish where Russian railway passes. Offensive on main front is unnecessary. We should stay defensive and reinforce Sarikamish. General Myshlayevsky placed both Bergmann and Yudenich's proposals to his order of the day.  At 11.30 a.m. Myshlayevsky  learned that Bardız village was already occupied by strong Turkish force. Therefore, Myshlayevsky changed his order of the day and He issued new order accepting Yudenich's defensive idea.

IX and X Corps Caught in Snowstorm (25-26 December)
On night of 24 December, Enver and his officers reached Bardız village from Narman in 14 hours on horseback. He declared that IX Corps should attack to Sarikamish because captive soldiers said that Sarikamish is defended by 2-3 scratch companies. He asked IX Corps commander Ali İhsan Paşa his idea. Ali İhsan Paşa said that “... According to this (The 17th and 28th divisions could not reach Bardız yet), it means that the IX Corps has no forces at hand for now, other than the 29th Division. I do not know the operational requirements concerning the army. It is said that there is no information from the X Corps. If your aim can be realized with the strength of a division tomorrow, the 29th Division is ready for action and command. Bronsart Pasha and Major Feldman also stated that they agreed with İhsan Pasha's opinion. After 3 days of marching, IX Corps needed rest. Communication between 9th and 10th Corps was cut after the X Corps deviated from initial plan by entering Oltu-Ardahan road in pursuit of Istomin's unit. Therefore, the commanders under Enver Pasha suggested to wait in Bardız until the X Corps reached its map objective. Enver Pasha, on the other hand, thought that if Sarikamish, where the railway passes, is captured, Russians would have no way to retreat and would surrender themselves.

On morning of 25 December, 29th Division moved to Sarikamish. The path was covered with 30 cm of snow.29th Division reached Kızılkilise village 8 kilometers northwest of Sarikamish. 29th Division prepared to bivouac in Kızılkilise. However, Enver Paşa ordered to attack Bardız Pass and capture Sarikamish supposed to behind Bardız Pass.

On evening of 25 December, 2 regiments of the 29th Division, on the orders of Enver Pasha, entered the forest to encircle the Russian troops defending the Bardız Pass. Hundreds of soldiers froze from the dispersed troops in the forest filled with ditches and cliffs, reducing the 29th Division's number by 50 percent. Turks took Bardız Pass from 1000 railwaymen at 12:00 p.m.. Only 1 battalion could pursuit escaping Russian troops due to exhaustion. It could not be successful in its attacks on Sarikamish alone. This night, even commander of Division and officers overcame frostbite by covering oilcloth to themselves together. Situation of soldiers was naturally more difficult.

As for X Corps, Hafız Hakkı pursued Istomin's brigade in 2 days, 24–25 December. Istomin gradually retreated, engaging in a successful distraction battle. Istomin retreated to Merdenek (now, Göle) village. 30th and 31st Divisions reached northern slopes of Allahu Ekber mountains. Hafız Hakkı left a regiment against Istomin's detachment and entered the Allahu Ekber mountains to cut the Sarıkamış-Kars railway line. Allahu Ekber track was rugged and snowcapped path where soldiers weren't able to get off from Allahu Ekber fewer than 19 hours. In 26 December 02.00 a.m., 30th and 31st Divisions entered Allahu Ekber Mountain. 2 Divisions caught by snowstorm and according to İlden, 10.000 soldiers died from frostbitein Allahu Ekber Mountains. Number of these 2 Divisions decreased to 3200 when they got off from Allahu Ekber on night of 26 December. X Corps lost 90% of troops before engaging in a major battle. Hafız Hakkı thought number of soldiers can be increased to 10.000 in 2 days from deserted soldiers, therefore he decided to continue offensive.

Battle of Sarikamish (December 26-January 4) 
On morning of 26 December, the number of Sarikamish detachment increased from a scratch 2.000 soldiers to 3.500-4.000 soldiers (1.5000 seasoned soldiers, 1.000 railwaymen, 1.000 militia with some hundreds of volunteers from the rear services). On 26 December, Muratoff claimed that the IX Corps had 10,000 soldiers, but Turkish sources say that after the Turkish army dispersed in the night attack on 25 December, on 26 December IX Corps had a force of only the size of an infantry regiment, or 3,000 soldiers. Only 5 regiments from the 9 regiments of the IX Corps were able to catch up 26 December attack. IX Corps commander, Ali İhsan Pasha, declared in an interview with the Russian newspaper that he had a total of 6,000 soldiers after he was captured by the Russians. Initial strength of IX corps was 28,000 soldiers. Majority of the 22,000 casualties are made up of fugitives. Contrary to popular belief, number of those who died from frostbite and disease was much less.

Turks went on a fierce offensive until evening. Turkish commanders persuaded Enver Pasha to stop the attack, which was made as a result of Enver's excessive insistence. Russian sources claimed that if this offensive had continued, Sarıkamish would have fallen. On the other hand,  Turk sources claimed Turkish army had suffered heavy casualties as a result of Enver Pasha's offensive orders described in short “ attack without considering casualties”, and in addition, the number of the Turkish army was less than the Russian troops defending Sarikamish and was very tired after days of marching.

On night of 26 December, General Voropanof, commander of the Sarikamish garrison, demanded from General Myshlayevski that the warehouses be destroyed and Sarikamish be abandoned, due to large number of casualties in the garrison. General Myshlayevski stated that Sarikamish should definitely not be left because the best way for the Russians to withdraw is the Sarikamish-Kars railway. General Myshlayevski and Bergmann panicked at the encirclement maneuver of the Turks and had already admitted defeat. Since the Karakurt-Kağızman road was not suitable for the passage of wheeled vehicles, it was not possible to withdraw from this road. That's why General Myshlayevski thought to save the army, or at least a part of the army, by using the Sarikamish-Kars railway.

5 Turkestan battalions appointed by Yudenich attacked towards Bardız and defeated the 82nd Regiment of the 28th Division, which was defending the Çakırtepe hills, with a bayonet charge. Observing this, the 32nd Division Commander Lieutenant Colonel Abdülkerim Bey gave up the idea of moving to Sarikamish and went to battle against Turkestan battalions.

On evening of December 26, the Sarikamish garrison was reinforced by the 80th Kabardinsky Regiment (4 infantry battalions, one thousand infantry per battalion) and Zaporojski Cossack Regiment (6 cavalry divisions). With this reinforcement, the Russian force defending Sarikamish increased to 10.000 soldiers supported by weak artillery. On Turkish side, after the 26 December offensive was stopped, deserters dispersed into forests were tried to be gathered and only on the afternoon of 26 December, 83rd and 84th Regiments of the 28th Division arrived. This division, too, had lost most of its force on the way, as it had been brought in by forced night marches. Numbers of Turkish troops isn't recorded in Turkish sources. Considering that Turks had 3,000 soldiers on the 26th of December, it can be estimated that there would not be more than 5,000 soldiers on 27 December.  Enver Pasha renewed his “attack without considering casualties” decree for 27 December. 29th Division managed to enter Upper Sarikamish Village (in Turkish sources, Çerkezköy (Circassianvillage)) at midday.  Colonel Bukretov counterattacked to village and encircled Turkish soldiers in village.

Meanwhile, Hafız Hakkı Bey sent a cavalry regiment on 27 December, occupied Selim station and destroyed the Sarikamish-Kars railway from there. On the same day, Stange Bey, who had an infantry regiment and Special Organization irregulars under his command, captured Ardahan, which was defended by 2,000 Russian soldiers.

On December 24, Nasuhi Bey, chief of staff of the X Corps, was captured by the Russians. A copy of the attack order given by Enver Pasha was found on Nasuhi Bey. The Russian commanders understood from this order that the Turkish forces attacking Sarikamish were the IX and X Corps. General Myslayesvki,  who knew that he could not stop 2 Corps with weak Russian forces defending Sarikamish, was sure that if the Russian army did not withdraw, it would be destroyed. However, General Msylayevski was unaware that the number of Turkish troops hastily sent to Sarikamish by forced marches had been reduced by 80%. As a result of Yudenich's insistence, he remained as commander of the Caucasian army until 28 December but news of the fall of Ardahan and cutting of the Sarikamish-Kars railway shook General Myshlayevsky deeply, and thought that he would be captured. On morning of 28 December, he left Mecingirt riding horses and set off first to Kağızman, then from Gyumri to Tbilisi. He did not appoint a commander-in-chief in his place. General Yudenich appointed to command 2nd Turkestan Corps and 6 battalions of 1st Caucasus Corps while remaining forces were commanded by General Bergmann. So many frictions broke out between General Bergmann and Yudenich for this appointment. For this reason, just after the victory was won (January 6, 1915), General Bergmann was dismissed and General Yudenich was appointed as the commander of all forces.

It took 29 December for the 30th and 31st Divisions to gather and reach Sarikamish from Başköy-Beyköy. Plan to capture Russian troops, who were thought to have come from Kars, lost 1 day to the 30th Division.

After Russians put an end to their offensive against the XI Corps on 24 December, the XI Corps remained inactive against the Russian forces from the beginning to the end of the battle. The plan of the Russians was to stay on the defensive against the XI Corps, to pull the forces against XI Corps to Sarıkamish and to protect Sarıkamish against Turks with these forces.

On 28 December, 155th Kubinski Regiment (4 battalions) and 1st Plastun Brigade (5 battalions) arrived in Sarıkamish from Yudenich's front. Therefore, Russian force in Sarıkamish increased to 20 infantry battalions, a cavalry regiment, 34 cannons and several score of machine guns under commander of 1st Plastun Brigade General Przevalski. Muratoff says that Russian force defending Sarıkamish has increased to 13–14.000 soldiers.

30th and 31st Divisions took on task of attacking Sarıkamish as the IX Corps number decreased to 1000 soldiers. According to the sources, the 30th and 31st Divisions were around 2000 soldiers, too. Although 93rd Regiment of 31st Division managed to enter Sarıkamish with 600 soldiers with night attack on 29 December, it had to retreat from Sarikamish due to dispersal of the soldiers in town and attack of the superior Russian forces. The soldiers who had captured the barracks in Sarıkamish were also taken prisoner by the Russian soldiers besieging the barracks on morning of 30 December.

On December 30, Russians brought 6 mortars from Mecingirt and started hitting Turkish positions with them. Colonel Bukretov couldn't take Turks in the village prisoner due to strong resistance of Turks and fires of other Turkish troops from hills to the north of the Upper Sarikamish for 3 days. Fire of mortars drove back Turkish troops in hills to north of the Upper Sarikamish. Russians placed the demolition mold they brought from Castle of Kars on the roof of the nearest hut and blew up this hut. All of the Turkish soldiers in the hut were killed. The Turkish soldiers who saw this explosion in the other hut surrendered. While the Russians give the number of surrendered soldiers as 300, the Turkish side says this number as 20. Since the number of prisoners taken from the Turks until January 2 was 3,000, it appears that the Russian sources exaggerated the amount of prisoners they took. The Russians, who claimed to take 300–400 soldiers every day from the XI Corps alone, should have taken more than 3000 prisoners from the 11th Corps alone on January 2.

Attack of the 32nd Division and the 82nd Regiment, which lasted for 4 days, was able to be repelled by 5 Turkestan battalions with 6 battalions of reinforcements. 32nd Division and 82nd Regiment, which started the attack with 7000 soldiers, decreased to 500 soldiers on 30 December due to snowstorm and desertion of soldiers. Number of IX Corps in Sarıkamish had decreased to 1000 soldiers. Number of X Corps was also around 2000. Therefore, commander of IX Corps, Ali İhsan Pasha, wrote to Enver Pasha in his report that we should abandon offensive and IX Corps could reach 10,000 after 10 days of recovery. Two days later, Hafız Hakkı Pasha also informed Enver Pasha that X Corps could reach 10,000 soldiers by gathering fugitives.

While a withdrawal order was expected on 31 December, Enver Pasha's general attack order for X Corps was met with astonishment. Although X Corps was able to penetrate the enemy's first lines in this attack, the last attack towards Sarıkamish, which was withdrawn due to heavy machine gun fire and counter-attacks from the rear lines, also ended in failure.
On January 1, IX Corps, which consisted of 900 soldiers, most of whom were wounded and with their hands and feet frozen, was reduced by half due to the Russian attacks against both the 28th Division defending Bardız Pass and the 29th and 17th Divisions. The 17th Division machine gun company were engaged until all its soldiers were killed and its machine guns was taken back by a squad of soldiers sent from the rear.

For a few days, Enver Pasha had been implying that you should leave IX Corps, which was surrounded by Russians and was likely to be destroyed, at least Ottoman Minister of War should not be captured by Russians. Enver Pasha refused these proposals, saying that he would die with soldiers. At the end, IX Corps chief of staff, whom Enver Pasha trusted a lot, Şerif İlden told Enver Pasha that no success could be expected from IX and X Corps, and that by using XI Corps, which was the last combat power, the IX and X Corps can be saved. Although Enver Paşa ordered the discovery of the roads for the withdrawal, he ordered the troops to wait in their positions. If the withdrawal order had been given now, IX Corps could have been saved.

Convincing General Bergmann with difficulty, who was still thinking of withdrawing to Kars against Turks on 30 December, Yudenich recommended that Bergmann move to Sarıkamish on 31 December and start an annihilation operation against Turkish forces besieging Sarikamish. General Bergmann lastly took 154th Derbenski Regiment from Yudenich, thus only 19 battalions remained under command of General Yudenich against Turkish XI Corps and 32nd Division. Fortunate for Yudenich, XI Corps and 32nd Division didn't attack against his detachment. Russians concentrated 7 battalions from Kars and 4 battalions of the 2nd Paston Brigade and 14 Cossack cavalry sotni (≈100) from Yudenich's troops to encircle and destroy IX and X Corps, whose total strength had decreased to 3000 soldiers on 31 December.

On 31 December, arrival of 154th Derbenski regiment brought by Bergmann in person, carried the active fighting strength available to 7000 men.

Colonel Bukretov took 6 battalions of reinforcements from General Przevalski to his detachment and attacked Bardız Pass, which defended by 28th Division and 86th Regiment. Number of soldiers on Turkish side decreased from 700 on 31 December to 150 soldiers on January 2. After this fierce offensive, in Colonel Bukretov's detachment, only 800 soldiers remained fit for the line out of 6 battalions. On 31 December, after the 32nd Division retreated against Colonel Dovgirt, General Prezavski took 3 Turkestan battalions from Dovgirt. Colonel Maslannikov, who was replaced after Bukretov's resignation, captured the Bardız Pass on January 2 with the reinforcement of these 3 Turkestan battalions. After the capture of the Bardız Pass, IX Corps was completely surrounded by Russians, and after 3 days of Russian offensive, on January 3, the total number of the IX Corps decreased to 104 soldiers and 106 officers.

On January 2, X Corps' number had decreased to 1000–1200. On January 1–3, X Corps attacked by 7 battalions brought from Kars and Sarıkamish garrison and successfully repelled these attacks.

Enver Pasha set off for Divik, where the X Corps is located, at dusk on January 2. After inspecting the X Corps, he saw that the situation of the X Corps was not different from that of the IX Corps, and on January 3, the Russian attacks on Divik were stopped with about 100 soldiers gathered as a result of their personal efforts. With order he gave on the evening of January 2, he united IX and X Corps under a single command under the name of the Left Flank Army and appointed Hafız Hakkı Bey as the Commander of the Left Flank Army and promoted to Brigadier General. By choosing path of Allahu Ekber, Hafız Hakkı Bey caused X Corps to be devastated in snowstorm. However, Enver Pasha trusted daring character of Hafız Hakkı Pasha, who was his classmate from War College, and made him the commander of IX and X Corps. Hafız Hakkı Pasha appointed as the 3rd Army Commander by Enver Pasha 5 days later.

On January 3, Sarikamish was over-crowded by 12.000 sick and wounded Russians and 3.000 Turkish prisoners. After General Bergmann had sent prisoner groups to Kars, he ordered that arrangements be made for the wounded to be transported to Kars immediately by loading them on both transport arms and weight cars. According to this enormous crowd of 15,000 people, Hafız Hakkı Pasha thought that Russians were evacuating Sarikamish. This mistake had caused him to keep his army one more day in mountains north of Sarikamish.

Final Defeat 
On January 4, Russians began a general offensive. After putting up a fierce resistance, IX Corps surrendered to Russians with 80 soldiers and 106 officers. At that time, Hafız Hakkı Pasha was in talks with the officers of the IX Corps to inspect IX Corps. He managed to avoid being captured by Russian troops by getting on his horse and escaping to X Corps under a rain of bullets.

X Corps succeeded in increasing its number highly by assembling deserters. On January 4, X Corps, which was attacked by forces in Sarıkamish addition to General Baratov's detachment, was able to resist Russians even though its right flank was broken, and it did not suffer disaster experienced by the IX Corps. Hafız Hakkı Pasha withdrew X Corps on night of January 4–5, and despite being constantly followed by the Russians, he saved all army's equipment and reached Bardız on January 6. On January 6, 30th and 31st Divisions consisted of 2,500 rifles and 16 cannons.

Enver Pasha left X Corps on morning of January 4. Army headquarters was attacked by 8-10 Cossack cavalries on the road, and the Cossack cavalry was dispersed by counterfire of the army headquarters. As a result of this fire, Bronsart Pasha, chief of staff of Enver Pasha, was wounded in his arm and a telegraph communications officer was wounded in his foot. Enver Pasha reached Bardız towards noon, which was in the hands of the 32nd Division, towards noon. Enver Pasha ordered the 32nd Division to unite with the XI Corps to attack the Russians in order to relief IX Corps, which he was not aware of its captivity, and retreating 10th Corps. 32nd Division could not attack due to fog on 4 January. Colonel Abdülkerim Bey, the commander of the 32nd Division, declared in his report that his division’ number increased from 500 soldiers to 4300. This shows that the most casualties in the Sarikamish Operation were due to desertions. Abdükerim Bey began his offensive on January 5. On January 6, as a result of the 2-day offensive, number of the 32nd Division was again reduced to 1500 soldiers. Infantry regiment left by X Corps against General Istomin on December 26, before entering Allahu Ekber Mountains, had also reduced to 2000 soldiers. From IX and X Corps, which had a total number of 68.000 soldiers at the beginning, only this force, which did not even reach 10.000, remained.

In the report he sent to Enver Pasha on 5 January, Galip Pasha, the commander of the XI Corps, requested 2 more days, citing the losses suffered by his Corps. As a result of the insistence of Enver Pasha on January 6, the offensive started and no success could be achieved except for the Russian forces being pushed back a little. Today, Enver Pasha received the report from Hafız Hakkı Pasha that IX Corps was destroyed and remnants of X Corps were gathered in Bardız.

Şerif İlden, who served as chief of staff of IX Corps in this battles, wrote in his memoirs that battle would most likely be won by Turks if Enver Pasha and Hafız Hakkı Pasha had not caused army to lose 80 percent of its number by giving forced marches orders on 25–26 December. Russians, who stated that they won the battle with great difficulty by fighting every day for 9 days, also confirm Ilden's claim. However, due to these wrong decisions made by Enver and Hafız Hakkı Pasha, this battle resulted in a complete disaster for Turks.

Aftermath
Enver Pasha, who was afraid that front would collapse with counterattack of the Russians, ordered V Corps of 1st Army, which was in Üsküdar on January 5, to move quickly to Caucasus to reinforce 3rd Army. Liman Von Sanders, who was the commander of the 1st Army at that time, wanted to keep this Corps against a possible British attack on Istanbul and with help of the German Embassy, he managed to prevent V Corps from being sent.

"Since the last hope of success was ended in this way and Enver Pasha was not allowed to stay away from Istanbul permanently, he left the army with his men on January 9, and İsmail Hakkı Bey [Hafız Hakkı Pasha] appointed to commander of 3rd army, by promoting him to the pasha [brigadier general] ”.

General Yudenich sent 34 battalions (1st and 2nd Plaston brigades (12 battalions), 3rd Caucasian Rifle Brigade (8 battalions) due to the cessation of the battles and 20th Infantry Division (14 battalions) Muratoff wrote 43 battalions, a typo it seems) sent to Crimea to support European front. After that, they took about 100,000 people from their reserves in a short time and formed an additional 17 battalions, as well as replenishing existing units that were reduced in Winter Campaign. By summer, number of Russian army reached 130.000, 35.000 cavalry and 340 guns. At that time, the Turks had a total of 52,351 soldiers and 131 cannons but in battles in summer, Turks defeated Russians.  
Although X Corps managed to escape from Russian encirclement, 3rd Army, whose number did not exceed 20.000 soldiers (XI Corps had 10.000 rifles on January 8 by receiving 5.000 soldiers reinforcement from Erzurum Garrison), was attacked and followed by Russians on all fronts. Due to scarcity of number and fatigue of soldiers, there were defeats in many parts of front and many prisoners were left. The detachment, which was left on the Oltu-Merdenek road, was attacked by General Kalitin detachment (18 cavalry sotnis and 3 battalions of 3rd Plaston Brigade), which was reinforced by 2 battalions of 263rd Regiment and the Caucasian Cossack Division (Cavalry). and Oltu, which was captured by Turks on 23 December, was recaptured by the Russians 3 weeks later on January 13. X Corps, which was attacked by Russians in the center, retreated from Bardız to Narman, and XI Corps to east of Azap. From January 18, Russian offensive stopped, and until April, calm began on the front.

Casualties 
Russian losses were up to 30,000: 16,000 killed and wounded and 12,000 sick/injured, mostly due to frostbite.

Although Hafız Hakkı Pasha and German Lieutenant Colonel Guse, who were commanders during the battles that took place December 22 - January 18, recorded their losses as low (Hafız Hakkı Pasha gives 30,000 deaths, Lieutenant Colonel Guse gives 2 numbers: 11,000 deaths, 3,500 prisoners and 30,000 deaths, 27,000 prisoners), if we look at the total manpower available to the Turkish army before and after the battle, total casualties stand at 109,108. 10,000 soldiers sent from Erzurum as reinforcements should be added to this number of casualties.

It seems that casualties in the winter campaign were due not to deaths in the first days of the battle, but due to an increase in epidemic disease cases that increased in the following days. Hunger and combat fatigue resulting from an inability to provide food due to snow-covered roads further increased the death rate as a result of epidemic. The number of deaths from typhus in the Turkish army was higher than the number of deaths in battle.

In popular culture
 Ballads was a book published in 1943 by Yaşar Kemal. It is a compilation of folk themes that include accounts of the Battle of Sarikamish.
 Vetluga Memoir is a historical document that describes the political and strategic mistakes made by the Ottoman Third Army and the final days of one corner of the Russian Empire written by a young Ottoman officer who was captured by the Russians.
 120 is a 2008 Turkish film about 120 children who died carrying ammunition to the battle.
 The Long Way Home is a 2013 Turkish film about a group of seven people and their quest to escape the war zone of Sarikamish.

References

Notes

Bibliography

External links

 The road to Sarikamish after the Turkish retreat, Dec. 1914 (video)

1914 in the Ottoman Empire
1915 in the Ottoman Empire
1910s in Armenia
Conflicts in 1914
Conflicts in 1915
Armenian genocide
Battles of the Caucasus Campaign
Battles of World War I involving the Ottoman Empire
Battles of World War I involving Russia
1914 in Armenia
1915 in Armenia
Enver Pasha
History of Kars Province
Kars Oblast
1914 in the Russian Empire
1915 in the Russian Empire
December 1914 events
January 1915 events
Ottoman Empire–Russian Empire relations